Risto Jankov (born 5 September 1998) is a Macedonian footballer who plays as a goalkeeper for Liga II club Politehnica Iași.

Club career
Jankov was promoted to the first team of Rabotnički in 2015. In August 2017, he was loaned to Lokomotiva Skopje in the Macedonian Second Football League, before returning to Rabotnički at the start of 2018. He made his first senior appearance for the Rabotnički in the Macedonian First Football League on 24 February 2018, coming on as a substitute in the 89th minute for outfielder Andrej Lazarov, after starting goalkeeper Daniel Bozinovski was sent off. The match finished as a 2–1 win for Rabotnički.

International career
In February 2021, Jankov was selected for a short training camp of the North Macedonia national team at the Petar Miloševski Training Centre. The following month, Jankov received his first official call-up for the national team, as a member of the squad for the 2022 FIFA World Cup qualifying matches against Romania, Liechtenstein and Germany. He was first included on the team bench in their match against Liechtenstein, a 5–0 home win. On 20 May 2021, Jankov was called-up by manager Igor Angelovski to the country's squad for the delayed UEFA Euro 2020 finals, the country's first major international tournament.

References

External links
 
 

1998 births
Living people
Footballers from Skopje
Macedonian footballers
North Macedonia youth international footballers
North Macedonia under-21 international footballers
Association football goalkeepers
FK Rabotnički players
FK Lokomotiva Skopje players
FC Caspiy players
FC Politehnica Iași (2010) players
Macedonian First Football League players
Macedonian Second Football League players
Kazakhstan Premier League players
Liga II players
UEFA Euro 2020 players
Macedonian expatriate footballers
Expatriate footballers in Romania
Macedonian expatriate sportspeople in Romania